This is a comparison of music notation programs.

General information

File formats and extensions

See also 
 Comparison of MIDI editors and sequencers
 List of guitar tablature software
 List of music software
 List of scorewriters

Notes

Multimedia software comparisons
Scorewriters